Maria Buzunova (born 19 August 1982) is a Belarusian former footballer who has played as a defender. She has been a member of the Belarus women's national team.

References

1982 births
Living people
Women's association football defenders
Belarusian women's footballers
Belarus women's international footballers
FC Minsk (women) players
Belarusian expatriate footballers
Belarusian expatriate sportspeople in Azerbaijan
Expatriate women's footballers in Azerbaijan
Bobruichanka Bobruisk players